The Museum of Belize is an art and history museum in Belize City, Belize.

History 
Built between 1854 and 1857 as a Her Majesty’s Prison while the area was still a British colony, it was a replacement for a wooden prison nearby. It was the Belize City Prison until 1993, when prisoners were then transferred to the Hattieville Prison

In 2002, it was restored and renovated into a national museum.

Exhibitions 
It features exhibits of Maya artifacts and explores some 3,000 years of Maya history, the prison's history, colonial life, and cultural exhibits of the many ethnic groups of the nation.

References

Museums in Belize
Mesoamerican art museums
Belize
Buildings and structures in Belize City
Archaeology of Belize
2002 establishments in Belize